Nebaliopsididae is a family of leptostracan crustaceans. It contains only two species, Nebaliopsis typica and Pseudonebaliopsis atlantica.

References

Leptostraca
Crustacean families